Mia Birkehøj Brogaard (née Olsen, born 15 October 1981) is a Danish former football defender. She played for the Denmark national team and Elitedivisionen club Brøndby.

Club career
As of September 2012, Brogaard held the all-time appearance record for Brøndby with 327 across all competitions. Malene Olsen is in second place with 247. Having begun her career as a forward, before moving back into defense, Brogaard had scored 74 goals for the club.

Brogaard took time out to have her son Villads in 2010. She returned to Brøndby in spring 2012 after playing some games with FC Damsø in 2011 to build up her fitness. In November 2013 Brogaard announced that she had retired from football.

 Statistics on Brøndby site
 253 games, 74 goals in National championships (Elitedivisionen) until September 9, 2012
 37 games, 3 goals in Danish Cup until September 9, 2012
 41 games, 4 goals in UEFA competitions
 327 games, 81 goals in all competitions until September 9, 2012

International career
Brogaard made her debut for the senior Denmark national team on 15 August 2002, as a second-half substitute in a 4–0 friendly win over North Korea in Copenhagen. Eight days later she made her first competitive appearance in a 2–0 World Cup qualifying defeat to France at Stade Félix-Bollaert.

She did not play again until returning to the team in April 2005, but was then named in the squad for UEFA Women's Euro 2005. Brogaard kept her place for the 2007 FIFA World Cup in China and UEFA European Championship 2009 in Finland, as Denmark exited both competitions in the first round.

After the latter tournament Brogaard announced her retirement from international football, but she relented and returned for the 2010 Algarve Cup.

Ahead of UEFA European Championship 2013, Brogaard secured a place in the team at left back. She was named in national coach Kenneth Heiner-Møller's squad for the final tournament in Sweden. She scored Denmark's goal in their second group match, a 2–1 defeat to Italy. Denmark's goal in their final group match, a 1–1 draw with Finland, was also attributed to Brogaard after her shot was deflected in off Nora Heroum.

References

External links
Danish Football Union (DBU) statistics
Profile at the Brøndby IF site

1981 births
Living people
Danish women's footballers
Denmark international footballers
Denmark women's international footballers
Brøndby IF (women) players
2007 FIFA Women's World Cup players
Association football defenders
Women's association football defenders